Brotorp is a district in Sundbyberg Municipality with 2172 inhabitants (in 2019), and a suburb in the Stockholm metropolitan area. It is the western part of the Järvastaden residential building project, and consists of low multi-residential buildings. The first inhabitant moved into Brotorp in 2007. The district Lilla Ursvik is located to the west.

References

Populated places in Sundbyberg Municipality
2007 establishments in Sweden